The following is a comprehensive discography of Jefferson Airplane, an American rock band which formed in San Francisco in 1965.

Albums

Studio albums

Compilation and live albums

Authorized UK releases
 Live at the Monterey Festival (1991)
 At Golden Gate Park (2006)
 At The Family Dog Ballroom (2007)
 Last Flight (2007)

Other compilation and live albums
 The Best of Jefferson Airplane (1980)
 Time Machine (1984)
 White Rabbit & Other Hits (1990)
 The Best of Jefferson Airplane (1992)
 Feed Your Head: Live '67–'69 (1996)
 Journey: The Best of Jefferson Airplane (1996)
 Jefferson Airplane and Beyond (1997)
 Through the Looking Glass (1999)
 The Roar of Jefferson Airplane (2001)
 Platinum & Gold Collection (2003)
 Cleared for Take Off (2003)
 The Best of Jefferson Airplane: Somebody to Love (2004)
 Fly Jefferson Airplane (DVD) (2004)
 The Essential Jefferson Airplane (2005)
 Best of Jefferson Airplane (2005)
 High Flying Bird: Live at the Monterey Festival (2006)
 The Very Best of Jefferson Airplane (2007)
 Feels Like '67 Again (2007), HHO Multimedia Ltd. London—Concerts during 1967 at the Winterland
 Plastic Fantastic Airplane (live from several concerts) (2008), HHO Multimedia Ltd. London
 Setlist: The Very Best of Jefferson Airplane Live  (2010)

Singles

References

Citations

Bibliography
 
 
 

Discographies of American artists
Rock music group discographies
Discography